Coor-Bishop House is a historic home located at New Bern, Craven County, North Carolina.  The original home was designed in the Georgian style by John Hawks and built about 1767.  Between 1904 and 1908, the house was extensively remodeled to incorporate both Queen Anne and Georgian Revival concepts.  The two-story frame dwelling features a high deck-on-hip roof, a projecting entrance pavilion, and a wide wraparound porch with Corinthian order columns.

It was listed on the National Register of Historic Places in 1972.

References

1767 establishments in North Carolina
Georgian Revival architecture in North Carolina
Houses completed in 1767
Houses in New Bern, North Carolina
Houses on the National Register of Historic Places in North Carolina
John Hawks buildings in New Bern, North Carolina
National Register of Historic Places in Craven County, North Carolina
Queen Anne architecture in North Carolina